The Toyota Racing Series is New Zealand's premier "open-wheeler" motorsport category. The series includes races for every major trophy in New Zealand circuit racing including the New Zealand Motor Cup and the Denny Hulme Memorial Trophy. The cars are also the category for the New Zealand Grand Prix - one of only two races in the world with FIA approval to use the Grand Prix nomenclature outside Formula One.

Teams and drivers
The following teams and drivers have competed during the 2005 Toyota Racing Series. All teams used Tatuus TT104ZZ chassis with Toyota engine.

Calendar

Drivers' Standings

References
toyotaracing.co.nz

Toyota Racing Series
Toy